Additional Housing Grant (abbrev: AHG) is an additional subsidy over and above the regular market subsidy and Central Provident Fund Housing Grant that new and resale HDB (Housing & Development Board) flat buyers in Singapore can enjoy.  It offsets the purchase price of a new or resale HDB flat in Singapore, thereby reducing the housing loan a flat buyer needs to take.

Overview
The AHG was first introduced on 3 Mar 2006 to help lower-income citizen families buy their first HDB flat.  Under the AHG, households earning below the monthly income ceiling can qualify for an additional subsidy (refer table).  The AHG has since undergone two enhancements.  The first was in Aug 2007, and the second enhancement was on 6 Feb 2009.

The latest increase in income ceiling from S$4,000 to S$5,000 increases the coverage of the AHG from 50 to 60 percent of resident households.  In addition, the condition of continuous employment preceding the flat application is reduced from two years to one year.

The enhanced AHG is applicable to the purchase of flats as follows:

Eligibility conditions
The AHG will only be given once to each eligible family.  As with the current scheme, the enhanced grant is given to Singapore Citizen only (not Singapore Permanent Residence spouse or an undischarged bankrupt), and can only be used as capital payment for the flat purchase.  The balance, if any, must be used to reduce the mortgage loan before a housing loan from HDB can be granted.

In addition to the current eligibility conditions to buy a new flat and the conditions of income ceiling and continuous employment, the family will have also to meet the following eligibility conditions to apply for the AHG:

Family Nucleus
The applicant must form a family comprising the applicant and his/her:
spouse; or
fiance/fiancee; or 
parents and siblings; or 
children under your legal custody (if you are widowed or divorced).

Household Status
The applicant and the other essential family members listed in the application for purchase of the flat: 
 are currently not owners of a flat bought direct from the HDB or a resale flat bought with the CPF housing grant; and 
 have not sold a flat bought direct from the HDB or a resale flat bought with the CPF housing grant; and 
 have not enjoyed other forms of housing subsidy (for example, bought an Executive Condominium from developer, enjoyed benefits under the Selective En bloc Redevelopment Scheme, privatisation of HUDC estate etc.).

Undischarged Bankrupt
The recipients of the housing grant must not be an undischarged bankrupt.

Details and benefits of enhanced AHG
The AHG is graduated to allow families with lower income to enjoy a higher grant.  The details of the enhanced grant are as follows:

References

External links

Public housing in Singapore
Real estate in Singapore